OHD may refer to:

Obsidian hydration dating
Orascom Hotels and Development
Ohrid "St. Paul the Apostle" Airport (IATA code OHD)

See also
ÖHD (disambiguation)